SS Andrew Turnbull was a Liberty ship built in the United States during World War II. She was named after Andrew Turnbull, a Scottish physician who later served as a British Consul at Smyrna, then part of the Ottoman Empire, in what is now Turkey. In 1768, he organized the largest attempt at British colonization in the New World by founding New Smyrna, Florida, named in honor of his wife's birthplace.

Construction
Andrew Turnbull was laid down on 15 December 1943, under a Maritime Commission (MARCOM) contract, MC hull 1222, by the St. Johns River Shipbuilding Company, Jacksonville, Florida; she was sponsored by Mrs. James C. Merrill, Jr., the wife of a Merrill-Stevens Drydock & Repair Co. executive, and was launched on 8 February 1944.

History
She was allocated to the Wessel Duval & Company, on 19 February 1944. On 6 November 1946, she was laid up in the National Defense Reserve Fleet, Astoria, Oregon. On 17 August 1954, she was withdrawn from the fleet to be loaded with grain under the "Grain Program 1954", she returned loaded on 28 August 1954. On 8 July 1957, she was withdrawn to be unload, she returned on empty 12 July 1957. She was sold for scrapping, 31 January 1968, to Zidell Explorations, Inc. She was removed from the fleet on 15 February 1968.

References

Bibliography

 
 
 
 

 

Liberty ships
Ships built in Jacksonville, Florida
1944 ships
Astoria Reserve Fleet
Astoria Reserve Fleet Grain Program